ABB Ltd. is a Swedish-Swiss multinational corporation headquartered in Zürich, Switzerland. The company was formed in 1988 when Sweden's Allmänna Svenska Elektriska Aktiebolaget (ASEA) and Switzerland's Brown, Boveri & Cie merged to create ASEA Brown Boveri, later simplified to the initials ABB. Both companies were established in the late 1800s and were major electrical equipment manufacturers, a business that ABB remains active in today. The company has also since expanded to robotics and automation technology.

It is ranked 341st in the Fortune Global 500 list of 2018 and has been a global Fortune 500 company for 24 years. Until the sale of its Power Grids division in 2020, ABB was Switzerland's largest industrial employer.

ABB is traded on the SIX Swiss Exchange in Zürich, Nasdaq Stockholm in Sweden, and the New York Stock Exchange in the United States.

An ABB entity plead guilty for bid rigging in 2001, and the company has had 3 US Foreign Corrupt Practices Act bribing resolutions against it - in 2004, 2010, and 2022.

History

Predecessor companies 

Allmänna Svenska Elektriska Aktiebolaget (ASEA, English translation: General Swedish Electrical Limited Company) was founded in 1883 in Västerås, Sweden by Ludvig Fredholm as manufacturer of electrical light and generators.

Brown, Boveri & Cie (BBC) was formed in 1891 in Zurich, Switzerland by Charles Eugene Lancelot Brown and Walter Boveri as a Swiss group of electrical engineering companies producing AC and DC motors, generators, steam turbines and transformers.

Formation and early years 
On 10 August 1987, ASEA and BBC announced they would merge to form ASEA Brown Boveri (ABB). The new corporation would remain headquartered in both Zurich, Switzerland and Västerås, Sweden, with each parent company holding 50 percent. The merger created a global industrial group with revenue of approximately $15 billion and 160,000 employees.

When ABB began operations on 5 January 1988, its core operations included power generation, transmission and distribution; electric transportation; and industrial automation and robotics.

In its first year, ABB made some 15 acquisitions, including the environmental control group Fläkt AB of Sweden, the contracting group Sadelmi/Cogepi of Italy, and the railway manufacturer Scandia-Randers A/S of Denmark.

In 1989, ABB purchased an additional 40 companies, including Westinghouse Electric's transmission and distribution assets, and announced an agreement to purchase the Stamford, Connecticut-based Combustion Engineering (C-E).

The following year, ABB bought the robotics business of Cincinnati Milacron in the US. The acquisition expanded ABB's presence in automated spot-welding and positioned the company to better serve the American automotive industry. ABB's 1991 introduction of the IRB 6000 robot, demonstrated its increased capacity in this field. The first modular robot, the IRB 6000, can be reconfigured to perform a variety of specific tasks. At the time of its launch, the IRB 6000 was the fastest and most accurate spot-welding robot on the market.

In the early 1990s, ABB started expanding in Central and Eastern Europe. By the end of 1991, the company employed 10,000 people in the region. The following year, that number doubled. A similar pattern played out in Asia, where economic reforms in China and the lifting of some Western sanctions, helped open the region to a new wave of outside investment and industrial growth. By 1994, ABB had 30,000 employees and 100 plants, engineering, service and marketing centers across Asia - numbers that would continue to grow. Through the 1990s, ABB continued its strategy of targeted expansion in Eastern Europe, the Asia-Pacific region and the Americas.

In 1995, ABB agreed to merge its rail engineering unit with that of Daimler-Benz AG of Germany. The goal was to create the world's largest maker of locomotives and railway cars. The new company, ABB Daimler-Benz Transportation (Adtranz), had an initial global market share of nearly 12 percent. The merge took effect on 1 January 1996.

A few months after the July 1997 Asian financial crisis, ABB announced plans to accelerate its expansion in Asia. The company also acted to improve the productivity and profitability of its Western operations, taking an $850 million restructuring charge as it shifted more resources to emerging markets and scaled back some facilities in higher-cost countries.

In 1998, ABB acquired Sweden-based Alfa Laval's automation unit, which at the time was one of Europe's top suppliers of process control systems and automation equipment.

As a final step in the integration of the companies formerly known as ASEA and BBC, in 1999 the directors unanimously approved a plan to create a unified, single class of shares in the group.

That same year, ABB completed its purchase of Elsag Bailey Process Automation, a Netherlands-based maker of industrial control systems, for $2.1 billion. The acquisition increased ABB's presence in the high-tech industrial robotics and factory control system sectors, which reducing its reliance on traditional heavy engineering sectors such as power generation and transmission.

Shift in business focus 
In 1999, the company sold its stake in the Adtranz train-building business to DaimlerChrysler. Instead of building complete locomotives, ABB's transportation activities shifted increasingly toward traction motors and electric components.

That same year, ABB and France-based Alstom, announced the merger of their power generation businesses in a 50-50 joint company, ABB Alstom Power. Separately, ABB agreed to sell its nuclear power business to British Nuclear Fuels of the United Kingdom.

In 2000, ABB divested its interests in ABB Alstom Power and sold its boiler and fossil-fuel operations (including Gas turbines) to Alstom. Thereafter, ABB's power business was focused on renewable energy and transmission and distribution.

In 2002, ABB announced its first-ever annual loss, a $691 million net loss for 2001. The loss was caused by ABB's decision to nearly double its provisions for settlement costs in asbestos-related litigation against Combustion Engineering in the US from $470 million to $940 million. The claims were linked to asbestos products sold by Combustion Engineering prior to its acquisition by ABB.

At the same time, ABB's board announced it would seek the return of money "paid in excess of obligations to Goran Lindahl and to Percy Barnevik," two former chief executive officers of the group. Barnevik received some $89 million in pension benefits when he left ABB in 2001; Lindahl, who succeeded Barnevik as CEO, had received $50 million in pension benefits.

In 2005, ABB delisted its shares from the London Stock Exchange and Frankfurt Stock Exchange.

In 2006, ABB put an end to its financial uncertainties by finalizing a $1.43 billion plan to settle asbestos liabilities against its US subsidiaries, Combustion Engineering and ABB Lummus Global, Inc. In August 2007, ABB Lummus Global, ABB's downstream oil and gas business, was sold to CB&I. In 2004, ABB had sold its upstream oil and gas business, ABB Vetco Gray. ABB's plan going forward was to support the oil and gas industry with its core automation and power technology businesses.

In 2008, ABB agreed to acquire Kuhlman Electric Corporation, a US-based maker of transformers for the industrial and electric utility sectors. In December 2008, ABB acquired Ber-Mac Electrical and Instrumentation to expand its presence in Western Canada's oil and gas industries.

In 2010 K-TEK, a manufacturer of level measurement instruments, became part of ABB's Measurement Products business unit within ABB's Process Automation division.

In July 2010, ABB in Cary, North Carolina received a $4.2 million grant from the federal government to develop energy storing magnets.

On 10 January 2011, ABB invested $10 million in ECOtality, a San Francisco-based developed of charging stations and power storage technologies, to enter North America's electric vehicle charging market. On 1 July ABB announced the acquisition of Epyon B.V. of the Netherlands, an early leader in the European EV-charging infrastructure and maintenance markets.

In 2011, ABB acquired Baldor Electric for $4.2 billion in an all-cash transaction. The move aligned with ABB's strategy to increase its market share in the North American industrial motors business.

On 30 January 2012, ABB acquired Thomas & Betts, a North American leader in low voltage products for industrial, construction and utility applications, in a $3.9 billion cash transaction. On 15 June 2012 it completed the acquisition of commercial and industrial wireless technology specialists Tropos.

In July 2013, ABB acquired Power-One in a $1 billion all-cash transaction, to become the leading global manufacturer of solar inverters. Also in 2013, Fastned selected ABB to supply more than 200 Terra fast-charging stations along highways in the Netherlands. Ulrich Spiesshofer was named ABB's CEO, succeeding Joe Hogan.

In 2016, ABB won the contract of TANAP Project in Turkey, ABB will deliver the telecommunications, security and control infrastructure to contribute to safe, secure and reliable operation of the pipeline throughout its lifetime.

The TANAP pipeline is the largest diameter, and with 1,850 km length the longest pipeline ever built in Turkey crossing 20 districts and will bring Azerbaijan's natural gas through Georgia, Turkey and Greece directly to Europe. The $11 billion TANAP pipeline will interconnect with the South Caucasus Pipeline (SCPx) at Turkey's border with Georgia and the Trans Adriatic (TAP) at its border with Greece.

On 6 July 2017, ABB announced it had completed its acquisition of Bernecker + Rainer Industrie-Elektronik (B&R), the largest independent provider of product and software-based, open-architecture for machine and factory automation.

In 2018, ABB became the title partner of the ABB FIA Formula E Championship, the world's first fully electric international FIA motorsport series.

On 30 June 2018, ABB completed its acquisition of GE Industrial Solutions, General Electric's global electrification business.

On 17 December 2018, ABB announced it had agreed to sell 80.1% of its Power Grids business to Hitachi. The former Power Grids division is now a part of the Hitachi Group and has been rebranded to Hitachi Energy.

In March 2020, ABB announced that it had agreed to sell its solar inverter business to Italian solar inverter manufacturer Fimer. The transaction includes all of ABB's manufacturing and R&D sites in Finland, Italy and India, along with 800 employees across 26 countries.

In December 2022, ABB opened a robotics mega factory in Shanghai. The new 67,000 square meter facility represents $150 million investment.

Products and services

Major product launches and innovations 
In 1990, ABB launched Azipod, a family of electric propulsion systems that extends below the hulls of large ships, providing both thrust and steering functions. Developed in cooperation with the Finnish shipbuilder Masa-Yards, Azipod has demonstrated the viability of hybrid-electric power in seagoing vessels, while also increasing maneuverability, fuel efficiency and space efficiency.

In 1998, ABB launched the FlexPicker, a robot using a three-armed delta design uniquely suited to the picking and packing industry.

In 2000, ABB brought to market the world's first commercial, high-voltage, shore-to-ship electric power, at the Swedish port of Gothenburg. Supplying electricity to berthed ships from the shore enables vessels to shut down their engines while in port, significantly reducing noise, vibrations and carbon emissions.

In 2004, ABB launched its Extended Automation System 800xA, an industrial system for the process industries. Today, the company is the global market leader in distributed control systems.

In 2014, ABB unveiled YuMi, a collaborative industrial robot. The innovative, dual-arm assembly robot permits people and machines to work side by side, unlocking new potential for automation in a range of industries.

In 2018, ABB unveiled the Terra High Power charger for electric vehicles, capable of delivering enough to charge in eight minutes to enable an electric car to travel 200 kilometers.

Electrification 
ABB's Electrification business area offers products and services from substation to socket. Customers include a wide range of industry and utility operations, plus commercial and residential buildings. The business has strong exposure to a range of rapidly growing segments, including renewables, e-mobility, data centers and smart buildings.

Its offerings include electric vehicle infrastructure, solar inverters, modular substations, distribution automation; products to protect people, installations and electronic equipment from electrical overload such as enclosures, cable systems and low-voltage circuit breakers; measuring and sensing devices, control products, switches and wiring accessories.

The business also offers KNX systems that integrate and automate a building's electrical installations, ventilation systems, and security and data communication networks. Electrification incorporates an "Electrification Solutions" unit manufacturing low voltage switchgear and motor control centers.

The acquisition of GE Industrial Solutions, which closed in June 2018, further strengthened ABB's #2 global position in electrification.

Motion 
ABB's Motion business area provides a range of electrical motors, generators, drives and services, as well as integrated digital powertrain solutions. Motion is the #1 player in the market globally.

Robotics and Discrete Automation 

ABB's Robotics & Discrete Automation business area combines machine and factory automation systems, mainly from B&R, which ABB acquired in 2017, with a comprehensive robotics concepts and applications suite.
ABB has installed over 300,000 robots globally. The Robotics & Discrete Automation business has been positioned to capture the opportunities associated with the “factory of the future” by providing services for flexible manufacturing and smart machinery.
The business is #2 globally, with a #1 position in robotics in the high-growth Chinese market, where ABB is expanding its innovation and production capacity by investing in a new robotics factory in Shanghai.

Process Automation 
The Process Automation business area provides a range of services for process and hybrid industries, including its industry-specific integrated automation, electrification and digital services, control technologies, software and advanced services, as well as measurement & analytics, marine and turbocharging offerings.

Power Grids 
The Power Grids business area offered components for the transmission and distribution of electricity, and incorporated ABB's manufacturing network for transformers, switchgear, circuit breakers, and associated high voltage equipment such as digital protective relays. It also offered maintenance services.

A key part of Power Grids' offering were turnkey systems and service for power transmission and distribution grids and for power plants; this included electrical substations and substation automation systems, flexible AC transmission systems (FACTS), high-voltage direct current (HVDC) systems, and network management systems. The division was subdivided into the four business units High Voltage Products, Transformers, Grid Automation and Grid Integration.

In 2010, ABB's North American headquarters in Cary, North Carolina, announced a new partnership with Sensus of Raleigh, North Carolina, to develop technologies to work together on smart grids.

In 2014, ABB formed with Hitachi a joint venture for HVDC system solutions in Japan.

In December 2018, ABB and Hitachi announced that the latter would take over ABB's entire Power Grids division for about $6.4 billion. Hitachi officially acquired 80.1% of the business in July 2020. Initially known as Hitachi ABB Power Grids, the new Hitachi subsidiary was rebranded as Hitachi Energy in October 2021. The transaction was one of Hitachi's biggest-ever deals, as it shifted focus to a higher-growth market for electricity networks.

Transportation

Rail transport 
ABB Group entered the heavy rail rolling stock manufacturing market in 1989 through a 40% shareholding in a consortium headed with Trafalgar House and some former British Rail employees purchased British Rail Engineering Limited (BREL), the state-owned manufacturing arm of British Rail. BREL was the first division of British Rail to be privatised as part of a phased plan initiated by the third Thatcher ministry. ABB took over two rolling stock manufacturing facilities from BREL; the Derby Litchurch Lane Works and York Carriage Works. Additionally ABB took over Crewe Works in a purely maintenance capacity. In September 1992, ABB Group purchased the stakes of the other members of the consortium to become the sole owner with the business rebranded ABB Transportation.

The first trains to roll off the production line at either facility under ABB ownership were an order for 22 three-carriage Class 320 electric multiple units, built at ABB York for suburban railways in and around Glasgow in 1990. The same year, ABB York completed an order for five similar four-car Class 322 units, built for the new Stansted Express service. Between 1990 and 1991, ABB York manufactured 24 two-car Class 456 third rail trains for Network SouthEast services out of London Waterloo. A further order for 97 four-car Class 465 trains was completed at ABB York for Network SouthEast services in and around Kent between 1991 and 1994. A number of diesel multiple units were also built at ABB York: firstly the 76 Class 165 suburban units for Chiltern Main Line and Great Western Main Line commuter services between 1990 and 1992, followed by 21 Class 166 three-car express units for longer-distance services out of London Paddington.

After initially continuing to focus on rolling stock refurbishment, the first new trains to roll off the production line at ABB Derby were the ten two-car Class 482 trains, built for the Waterloo & City line while it was still under the control of Network SouthEast (since transferred to the London Underground). In 1995, ABB Derby built 16 four-car Class 325 electric freight multiple units for the Royal Mail to replace their ageing fleet of parcels carriages. During the mid-1990s, in a bid to expand their international portfolio, both the Derby and York plants completed a number of ABB Eurotram light rail vehicles for the Strasbourg tramway in France. Around the same time, in a further diversification, ABB partnered with Brush Traction to construct the fleet of 46 Class 92 electric locomotives for hauling freight trains through the Channel Tunnel; ABB were involved in the design and construction of many components including the traction motors, while final assembly took place at Brush Works in Loughborough.

The last trains to roll off the production line at ABB York were an order for 41 four-carriage Class 365 electric multiple units for Connex South Eastern and West Anglia Great Northern services between 1994 and 1995. Increased competition from other manufacturers following the privatisation of British Rail let to a decline in orders for trains manufactured by ABB, as they no longer held a monopoly on rolling stock manufacturing for the British market. As part of a rationalisation of the business, ABB York was closed in 1996, although it would later be reopened as a rail wagon manufacturing centre by the Thrall Car Manufacturing Company. Following the closure of the York plant, all manufacturing activity was relocated to ABB Derby, operation of which was transferred to the Adtranz joint venture between ABB and Daimler in 1996.

Adtranz unveiled the Class 168 train for Chiltern Railways in 1997. The Class 168 would subsequently evolve into the Turbostar and Electrostar families of related train designs, which went on to become the most successful rolling stock design on post-privatisation British railways by number of units sold. ABB sold its 50% stake in Adtranz to Daimler in 1999, ending their role in railway rolling stock manufacturing. Daimler subsequently sold the entire Adtranz operation to Bombardier Transportation in 2000.

Trolleybuses 
In May 2013, ABB Sécheron SA joined with several groups in Geneva TOSA (Trolleybus Optimisation Système Alimentation, or in English, Trolleybus Power System Optimization) in a one-year demonstration of a trolleybus route using a novel charging system. Rather than overhead wires, charging is accomplished by fixed overhead devices located at stops along the route and at the terminus. Jean-Luc Favre, head of Rail ISI, discussed the promising role of improved electric transport technology in ABB.

Electric roads 
ABB announced in 2021 that it is involved in the construction of the first permanent electric road that powers private vehicles and commercial vehicles such as trucks and buses.

Management 
In August 2019, ABB announced industrial veteran Björn Rosengren would take over as CEO starting March 2020. Rosengren was then serving as chief executive officer of Swedish mining-equipment giant Sandvik AB. In the meantime, ABB Chairman Peter Voser was appointed interim CEO on 17 April 2019, succeeding Ulrich Spiesshofer, who stepped down after five-and-a-half years. Voser was elected chairman of the board of directors in April 2015 and succeeded Hubertus von Grünberg, who had been chairman since May 2007. Jürgen Dormann was chairman from 2002 to 2007, and Percy Barnevik from 1999 to 2002.

Primary investors 
The largest single stake in the firm is held by the Swedish investment company Investor AB, controlled by the Wallenberg family, which holds 12.9%. Activist investor Cevian also holds a large stake in the company.

Corruption 
In Dec 2022, ABB was charged by the U.S. Securities and Exchange Commission (SEC) for violations of the Foreign Corrupt Practices Act (FCPA) in a bribery scheme in South Africa. It was ordered to pay $460 million to U.S. authorities to settle criminal and civil charges. ABB paid more than $37 million in bribes to a high-ranking Eskom official to influence contracts awarded by the state-owned electric utility company for work on the Kusile Power Station project between 2014 and 2017. The official had influence over the awarding of contracts for power projects in the country. In exchange for the bribes, ABB secured a $160 million contract to provide services related to cabling and installation work at Eskom’s Kusile Power Station, one of the largest coal-fired power plants in the world.

In a parallel case, the DOJ fined ABB $315 million to settle criminal charges. ABB agreed to repay $104 million it was paid in connection with Kusile.

See also 
 GREEN Cell Shipping
 Legrand
 Stromberg (company)

References

Further reading 
 ABB (2005): The Dormann Letters, Jürgen Dormann/ABB Group, Zurich
 Bélanger, Jacques et al. (2001): Being local worldwide: ABB and the challenge of global management, Cornell University Press, New York. 
 Kevin Barham, Claudia Heimer (1998): ABB: the dancing giant – creating the globally connected corporation. Financial Times, London.

External links 
 
 
 
 

 
Swiss companies established in 1988
Manufacturing companies established in 1988
Companies formerly listed on the Frankfurt Stock Exchange
Companies formerly listed on the London Stock Exchange
Companies listed on the Bombay Stock Exchange
Companies listed on the New York Stock Exchange
Companies listed on the SIX Swiss Exchange
Companies listed on Nasdaq Stockholm
Companies related to the Wallenberg family
Engineering companies of Sweden
Engineering companies of Switzerland
Electric motor manufacturers
Electric transformer manufacturers
Electric vehicle industry
Electrical engineering companies
Electrical equipment manufacturers
International engineering consulting firms
Engineering consulting firms of Sweden
Industrial machine manufacturers
Industrial robotics companies
Locomotive manufacturers of Switzerland
MES software
Multinational companies headquartered in Switzerland
Robotics in Sweden
Swedish brands
Swiss brands
Manufacturers of industrial automation